Red mist may refer to:

 Anger
 Red Mist, a fictional superhero in the comic book series Kick-Ass and the movie Kick-Ass
 "Red Mist", a song from the 2005 Boondox album The Harvest
 "Red Mist", a song from the 2001 Fuck the Facts album Mullet Fever
 "Red Mist", a song from the Danny Byrd album Supersized.
 Red Mist, a 2011 novel by Patricia Cornwell following the Dr. Kay Scarpetta storyline
 Red Mist (film) (international title Freakdog), a 2008 British horror film directed by Paddy Breathnach
 "Red Mist", also known as "Squidward's Suicide", an internet fan-made SpongeBob SquarePants creepypasta.

See also 
 Red Mist: Roy Keane and the Football Civil War, by Conor O'Callaghan